The Flowery Range is a mountain range associated with the Virginia Range in Storey County, Nevada.

The range was so named on account of wildflowers which bloom when watered by melting snow.

References 

Mountain ranges of Nevada
Mountain ranges of Storey County, Nevada